Tony Gunawan (born 9 April 1975) is an Indonesian-born American former badminton player. He gained several international achievements for Indonesia and later for the United States, including Olympic gold medal and world champion title.

Career
Gunawan is a former Olympic gold medalist and world champion for Indonesia, and later a world champion for the United States. He is regarded by many, including his peers, as one of the greatest doubles players in badminton's history. A superb all-court player with a particular facility in the forecourt, he won the 2000 Olympic gold medal, the 2001 IBF World Championships, and 2005 IBF World Championships with 3 different men's doubles partners.

He won the Men's Doubles gold medal in the 2005 World Championships from the 13th seeded position with his American partner Howard Bach. Gunawan partnered with Halim Haryanto to win the 2001 World Championships as well as the 2001 All-England Open, and with Candra Wijaya to win the 2000 Olympics in Sydney. He was a member of the world champion 2000 Indonesia Thomas Cup team, winning his match in the final against China with yet another partner, Rexy Mainaky.

Gunawan and Bach won the 2005 IBF World Championships Men's Doubles gold over Gunawan's ex-partner Wijaya and Sigit Budiarto who were also finalists in the 2003 IBF World Championships in the same event. Tony played for Indonesia from 1992 to 2001 and is the winner of numerous international titles. He has coached and played for USA since 2001. Tony is currently studying in Orange County, California and coaches at San Gabriel Badminton Club 2 (Pomona).

Personal life
He married Indonesian women's doubles player, Etty Tantri on 29 July 2002 at the Monte Carlo Chapel in Las Vegas. They have two sons, Christopher and Leon.

Achievements

Olympic Games 
 2000 Summer Olympics at the Sydney Showground Hall 3, Sydney, Australia

IBF World Championships 
 2005 IBF World Championships at the Arrowhead Pond in Anaheim, United States.

 2001 IBF World Championships at the Palacio de Deportes de San Pablo in Seville, Spain.

World Cup 
Men's doubles

World Badminton Grand Prix Finals 
Men's doubles

Asian Championships 
Men's doubles

Asian Cup 
Men's doubles

Pan American Games 
Men's doubles

Southeast Asian Games 
Men's doubles

BWF Super Series (1 title, 4 runners-up)
Men's doubles

 BWF Superseries Finals tournament
  BWF Superseries Premier tournament
 BWF Superseries tournament

IBF World Grand Prix (36 titles)
Men's doubles

Mixed doubles

Other results

Performance timeline

Indonesian team 
 Senior level

Individual competitions 
 Senior level

References

General

 
 
 
 Tony Gunawan at cnnsi.com

External links
 
 
 
 

1975 births
Living people
Sportspeople from Surabaya
Indonesian people of Chinese descent
Indonesian male badminton players
Badminton players at the 2000 Summer Olympics
Olympic badminton players of Indonesia
Olympic gold medalists for Indonesia
Olympic medalists in badminton
Medalists at the 2000 Summer Olympics
Badminton players at the 1998 Asian Games
Asian Games gold medalists for Indonesia
Asian Games medalists in badminton
Medalists at the 1998 Asian Games
Competitors at the 2001 Southeast Asian Games
Southeast Asian Games silver medalists for Indonesia
Southeast Asian Games medalists in badminton
Indonesian emigrants to the United States
American people of Chinese-Indonesian descent
American male badminton players
Badminton players at the 2012 Summer Olympics
Olympic badminton players of the United States
Badminton players at the 2011 Pan American Games
Pan American Games gold medalists for the United States
Pan American Games medalists in badminton
Badminton coaches
Medalists at the 2011 Pan American Games
World No. 1 badminton players